The Esailing Team World Championship also known as the Esailing Nations' Cup is an annual esports competition, first held in 2020 and officially recognised by World Sailing the main sports governing body. 

Teams are composed by National sailing federation and must contains male and female players, as well as at least one U21 player.

Nation Cup 2020

Participating teams 
13 teams participated in the 2020 nations cup. A fleet seeding round allowed to populate a bracket tournament which ran over the months of September to November 2020.

,,,,,,,,,,,,

winning team: Great Britain

Championship final table

Nation Cup 2021

Participating teams 
15 teams participated in the 2021 nations cup. A fleet seeding round allowed to populate a bracket tournament which ran over the months of September to November 2021.

,,,,,,,,,,,,,,

Winning team: France

Championship final table

Nation Cup 2022

Participating teams 
15 teams participated in the 2022 nations cup.  Teams have been first been split in 4 Groups of 4 for a Round Robin phase.
Each first and second of each group qualified to populate a bracket tournament that ran over the month of November & December 2022.

,,,,,,,,,,,,,,

Winning team: France

Championship final table

References 

Sailing
E Sports
Sailing
Sailing